Amantis aliena is a species of praying mantis native to Myanmar.

See also
List of mantis genera and species

References

aliena
Mantodea of Southeast Asia
Insects of Myanmar
Insects described in 1920